Douglas Frederick Wilson (born July 5, 1957) is a Canadian former professional ice hockey defenceman, who later served as general manager of the San Jose Sharks of the National Hockey League. He won the 1984 Canada Cup with Team Canada.

Playing career
After a junior hockey career for the Ottawa 67's in the Ontario Major Junior Hockey League, Wilson was drafted in the first round, sixth overall, in the 1977 NHL Entry Draft. He then played 14 seasons with the Chicago Black Hawks and two years for the San Jose Sharks in the National Hockey League. He was the first captain in Sharks history, serving two years before retiring after the 1992–93 season.

Wilson played 14 seasons in Chicago and still ranks as the club's highest-scoring defenceman in points (779 — sixth overall), goals (225 — 12th overall) and assists (554 — third overall). Wilson is fifth all-time in games played (938) for Chicago. He also led all Blackhawks defencemen in scoring for 10 consecutive seasons (1980–81 through 1990–91). In 1982, he was awarded the James Norris Memorial Trophy, as the League's top defenceman. That year, he had 39 goals and 85 points, which are still the Blackhawks single-season records for goals and points by a defenceman.

He was selected to eight NHL All-Star Games (seven with Chicago and one with San Jose). While with Chicago, Wilson was named as an NHL First Team All-Star in 1982 and twice was named as an NHL Second Team All-Star (1985 and 1990).

Wilson agreed to waive his no-trade clause and was acquired by San Jose from Chicago just before the Sharks first season (1991–92) for prospect Kerry Toporowski and San Jose's 2nd round choice in the 1992 NHL draft. Wilson brought instant credibility and respect to the young franchise. He played two seasons for the Sharks, scoring 48 points (12 goals, 36 assists) in 86 games.

Other career highlights include serving as the franchise's first team captain (1991–93), being the team's first representative in an All-Star Game (1991–92), playing in his NHL-milestone 1,000th game on November 21, 1992, (77th player in League history) and twice named Sharks nominee (1992 and 1993) for the King Clancy Memorial Trophy (for leadership and humanitarian contributions both on-and off-the-ice). At his 1,000th NHL game-played ceremony, he announced the creation of the Doug Wilson Scholarship Foundation. This scholarship provides assistance to worthy college-bound Bay Area students, and continues today.

Wilson announced his retirement as a member of the Sharks during training camp in 1993–94 after playing in 1,024 career games. In addition, he played in 95 career playoff games and scored 80 points (19 goals, 61 assists). The Ottawa native scored 827 points (237 goals, 590 assists) during his career that began in 1977–78 with Chicago.

Wilson was elected to the Hockey Hall of Fame on June 24, 2020, in his 24th year of eligibility.

Career achievements
 Hockey Hall of Fame (2020)
 James Norris Memorial Trophy winner as best defenceman in NHL (1982), nominee in 1990
 King Clancy Memorial Trophy nominee (1992, 1993)
 First Team All-Star (1981–82)
 2-time Second Team All-Star (1984–85, 1989–90)
 8-time NHL All-Star Game selection (1982, 1983, 1984, 1985, 1986, 1987, 1990, 1992) 
 Member of gold medal-winning Team Canada at Canada Cup (1984)
 Chicago Blackhawks leader in career goals and points by a defenceman
 Led all Chicago Blackhawks defencemen in scoring for 10 consecutive seasons
 First captain in San Jose Sharks team history

Retirement and executive career
In 2004, Wilson was named to the Positive Coaching Alliance's National Advisory Board. PCA, established at Stanford University in 1998, tries to create a positive character-building experience by using sports to teach life lessons. The "win-at-all-costs" mentality is de-emphasized in PCA.

Wilson was inducted into the Chicago Sports Hall of Fame in September 1999. He also serves on the NHL's board of directors for the alumni association.

In October 1998, the Ottawa 67s honored his career by retiring his No. 7 sweater. Known as an offensive defenceman, he recorded 295 points in 194 OHL games with the 67s from 1975–77. In addition, during the same weekend of activities in his hometown, he was inducted into the Ottawa Sports Hall of Fame.

The San Jose Sharks hired Wilson as general manager on May 13, 2003, replacing Dean Lombardi, who had been dismissed on March 18. As general manager, Wilson was credited with building the Sharks into a perennially competitive team, reaching their first Stanley Cup Final in 2016. On April 7, 2022, Wilson stepped down from the position permanently to focus on his health, having been on medical leave since November 26, 2021, following two months of a non-COVID-19 related persistent cough; assistant general manager Joe Will filled in for the remainder of the season. On July 5, 2022, still dealing with his undisclosed illness, Wilson retired, with former San Jose Shark Mike Grier replacing him as general manager.

Personal life
Doug and his wife, Kathy, have four children: Lacey, Doug, Charlie and Chelsea. His daughter Chelsea plays volleyball for the University of Southern California. His son Doug played hockey in Australia for the Melbourne Ice before joining the front office of the Sharks. His daughter Lacey was Miss Massachusetts USA in 2010 and Miss Illinois Teen USA in 2002.

His brother, Murray Wilson, won four Stanley Cups with the Montreal Canadiens.

Career statistics

Regular season and playoffs

International

See also
 List of NHL players with 1,000 games played

References

External links
 

1957 births
Living people
Canadian ice hockey coaches
Canadian ice hockey defencemen
Chicago Blackhawks draft picks
Chicago Blackhawks players
Hockey Hall of Fame inductees
Ice hockey people from Ottawa
Indianapolis Racers draft picks
James Norris Memorial Trophy winners
National Hockey League All-Stars
National Hockey League first-round draft picks
National Hockey League general managers
Ottawa 67's players
San Jose Sharks coaches
San Jose Sharks executives
San Jose Sharks players
San Jose Sharks scouts